Agrotis giffardi is a moth of the family Noctuidae. It was first described by Otto Herman Swezey in 1932. It is endemic to the island of Hawaii.

External links

Agrotis
Endemic moths of Hawaii
Moths described in 1932